Schnake Turnbo Frank is a public relations and leadership development firm with offices in Tulsa, Oklahoma and Oklahoma City, Oklahoma. Founded in 1970 in Tulsa by Charles Schnake, STF is the oldest public relations firm in Oklahoma. Steve Turnbo joined the firm in 1982, creating Schnake Turnbo & Associates. Schnake served as chairman emeritus until June 27, 2009 when he died at the age of 78.

Becky J. Frank joined the firm as partner in 2000 and was named CEO in 2006. Steve Turnbo currently serves as the firm's Chairman Emeritus with partner, Becky J. Frank, as chairman and CEO. Russ Florence joined the firm in 2000 and is now partner, president and COO. In 2008, the firm expanded into Oklahoma City. Aaron Fulkerson and David Wagner joined the firm in 2010 and now serve as partners.

References

External links
Official Web site

Public relations companies of the United States
Companies based in Tulsa, Oklahoma
Business services companies established in 1970
1970 establishments in Oklahoma